Anita Udeep is an Indian screenwriter and director, who has worked on Tamil and English language films.

Career
The daughter of businessman Venkataramana Chandrasekaran of Pentafour, Anita initially studied an engineering degree in Chennai, before enrolling at Loyola Marymount University in Los Angeles to do a master's degree in Film and TV Production for three years. During her time in the United States, Anita made a series of short films such as Flowery Thorn and Om, while also working as an intern for Steven Spielberg's science fiction miniseries Taken (2002). Anita had a strong interest in the Indian film industry and initially worked as a singer in Tamil films after returning to India. Her early songs included  "Azhagiya Asura"  from D. Imman's album for the Tamil slasher film Whistle (2003), while she also contributed to the pop album Mugangal.

Aged 25, Anita opted to direct her first feature film in 2003 and subsequently made the English language film Knock, Knock, I'm Looking to Marry for her home production studios N-Viz Entertainment and Pentamedia Group. Starring rookie actors Suhaas Ahuja and Rathi Arumugam in the lead roles, the film was made by a young crew including cinematographer Preetha Jayaraman and music composer Mahesh Shankar. She later directed the animated film Gulliver's Travel for her father's production house.

Anita continued her interest in films by managing her father's Mayajaal multiplex in Chennai, before opting to make the college drama Kulir 100° (2009) starring Sanjeev and Riya Bamniyal in the lead roles. For the film, she started a new production house named Envis Entertainment, and wrote a script based on the lives of wealthy college kids in Ooty. Despite garnering pre-release publicity owing to its popular music album, the film opened to negative reviews and did not fare well commercially.

Anita then worked with actress Oviya for the coming-of-age film 90ML (2019), which garnered publicity prior to its release for its tackling of historically taboo subjects in Tamil cinema.

Personal life
Anita is married to Udeep, the CEO of Splash TV channel.

Filmography

Discography

References

External links
 

1978 births
Living people
Tamil film directors
Film directors from Chennai
Indian women film directors
21st-century Indian film directors
Tamil screenwriters
Indian women screenwriters
Screenwriters from Chennai
Women artists from Tamil Nadu
21st-century Indian women artists